German submarine U-1273 was a Type VIIC/41 U-boat of Nazi Germany's Kriegsmarine during World War II.

She was ordered on 23 March 1942, and was laid down on 7 June 1943, at Bremer Vulkan-Vegesacker Werft, Bremen-Vegesack, as yard number 68. She was launched on 10 January 1944, and commissioned under the command of Oberleutnant zur See Karl-Heinz Voswinkel on 16 February 1944.

Design
German Type VIIC/41 submarines were preceded by the heavier Type VIIC submarines. U-1273 had a displacement of  when at the surface and  while submerged. She had two shafts and two  propellers.

U-1273 was fitted with five  torpedo tubes (four fitted at the bow and one at the stern), fourteen torpedoes, one  SK C/35 naval gun, (220 rounds), one  Flak M42 and two  C/30 anti-aircraft guns. The boat had a complement of between forty-four and fifty-two.

Service history
On 17 February 1945, U-1273 struck a British air-laid mine off Horten in the Skagerrak in Oslofjord. Kapitänleutnant Helmut Knollmann and 42 other crewmen died out of a crew of 51.

See also
 Battle of the Atlantic

References

Bibliography

German Type VIIC/41 submarines
U-boats commissioned in 1944
World War II submarines of Germany
1943 ships
Ships built in Bremen (state)
Maritime incidents in February 1945
World War II shipwrecks in the Skagerrak
U-boats sunk by mines